This is a list of active ships currently in service with the Royal Netherlands Navy.

Royal Netherlands Navy ship prefix
In Dutch, ships are given the prefix "Zijner Majesteits" ("his majesty's", abbreviated "Zr.Ms.") or "Hare Majesteits" ("her majesty's", abbreviated as "Hr.Ms."). In English, the Dutch prefix is translated as "HNLMS" for "His/Her Netherland Majesty's Ship". Some authors translate Hr./Zr.Ms. as "HNMS" but that abbreviation is ambiguous: the "N" might stand for "Netherlands" or "Norway". The most common way to avoid this ambiguity is to use "HNLMS" and "HNoMS" respectively.

Submarine service

Naval squadron

Frigates

Offshore patrol vessels

Amphibious warfare

Joint Support Ship

Mine countermeasures

Diving support vessels

Hydrographic survey ships

Other ships

Logistics and amphibious support vessel

Submarine support ship

Naval training vessels

Noordzee-class coastal tugs

:
  [2016] Damen ASD 2810 Hybrid
  [2016] Damen ASD 2810 Hybrid
  [2016] Damen ASD 2810 Hybrid

Linge-class coastal tugs
:

  [1997]

Breezand-class harbour tugs
:
  [1989]
  [1990]

Schelde-class harbour tugs
:
  [1987]
  [1987]
  [1986]
  [1986]
  [1986]

Noorderhaaks-class harbour patrol vessel

  [2015]
  [2015]

Landing craft
 5 LCU mkII
 12 LCVP mkVc
 48 FRISC Craft
 24 RHIB boat

Coast Guard
 Netherlands Coastguard

 Although the Coastguard is not officially part of the Navy, it is under its operational control. It does not have any ships of its own but uses vessels that have been assigned to it by other government ministries.
 Aruba, Curaçao, Sint Maarten and Caribbean Netherlands Coastguard
 4 patrol boats
 6 inshore patrol boats
 3 cutters

See also
 Future of the Royal Netherlands Navy
 Netherlands Marine Corps
 Pantserschip
 List of battleships of the Netherlands
 List of cruisers of the Netherlands
 List of Netherlands sail frigates
 List of minesweepers of the Royal Netherlands Navy
 List of monitors of the Netherlands
 List of submarines of the Netherlands

References

External links
 
 

 
Netherlands
Netherlands